George I Ghisi (died 15 March 1311) was a Latin feudal lord in medieval Greece. 

A son of Bartholomew I Ghisi, through his first marriage to a daughter of Guy II of Dramelay he was Baron of Chalandritsa in the Principality of Achaea. In 1292, he was also named as castellan of Kalamata. In that year, following a series of destructive raids in the Greek and Latin-held islands of the Aegean Sea, the Aragonese admiral Roger of Lauria led his fleet to anchor at Navarino. Fearful lest the Aragonese seize possession of lands in Achaea, or repeat their plundering raids, and with Prince Florent of Hainaut absent in Italy, George assembled two hundred knights at Androusa and attacked the Aragonese. In a brief but bloody combat, the Achaeans were defeated and George captured, only to be ransomed for 8,000 hyperpyra shortly after when the Aragonese fleet sailed to Glarentsa.

In 1303, when his father died, he inherited the lordship of the Aegean islands of Tinos, Mykonos, with fiefs on Serifos and Keos. Through his second wife, Alice dalle Carceri, he also became triarch of Negroponte (Euboea). He was killed in the Battle of the Cephissus against the Catalan Company in 1311. According to A. Bon, his wife Alice died in 1313.

References

Sources 
 
 
 
 

13th-century births
1311 deaths
Barons of the Principality of Achaea
Triarchs of Negroponte
People killed in action
Lords of Tinos and Mykonos
Ghisi family
13th-century Venetian people
14th-century Venetian people